Om Namo Venkatesaya is a 2017 Indian Telugu-language Hindu devotional biographical film directed by K. Raghavendra Rao and produced by A. Mahesh Reddy on AMR Sai Krupa Entertainments banner. The film stars Nagarjuna as Hathiram Bhavaji, alongside Anushka Shetty, Jagapathi Babu, Saurabh Raj Jain, and Pragya Jaiswal. Sai Kumar, Rao Ramesh, Sampath Raj, Ashmita Karnani, Brahmanandam, and Ajay play supporting roles.  It has music composed by M. M. Keeravani. The film was dubbed in Tamil as Akhilandakoti Brahmandanayagan. The film failed at the box office.

Plot
The film begins with Rama, born in Dalpatpur Uparhar village in Ayodhya, India, leaves the house in childhood itself in search of God and meets a saint Anubhavananda Swamy who assures him that it will happen and he also plays with him. Swamy teaches Rama the dice game and later advises him to meditate. After 15 years, Lord Venkateswara appears in the form of a child and disturbs his meditation when Rama asks Him to go away. After that, he reaches back to his hometown where his parents fix his alliance with his cousin Bhavani. Just before the marriage, Rama gets a call from his mentor in the dream that the time has arrived to play with God. Forthwith, he rushes to call off the wedding when Anubhavananda Swamy states that the boy who appeared before him is Lord Venkateswara. 

Hence, Rama heads Tirumala where Krishnamma another ardent devotee who believes herself as the wife of the Lord and dedicates her life to his service. Besides, Govindarajulu, the temple administrator, performs illegal acts, misuses the temple funds, and makes the workers his slaves. Meanwhile, Rama reaches Tirumala and calls the Lord in the name of Balaji out of love and affection. But Rama is not allowed into the temple, so, he sits outside for seven to eight days without having food or sleep. Govindarajulu orders his men to kick him, and they strike him very badly when the temple elephant rescues him. Later, Krishnamma treats him in her Ashram. In her guidance, Rama learns about Sthala Puranam (History of the Temple) and decides to begin a new horizon at Tirumala by campaigning it to the pilgrims to make them aware of the true nature of the Lord. He also encounters Govindaraju by protecting pilgrims and employees from his atrocities. 

Now, Rama constructs a new Ashram at the hilltop and starts cultivating their flowers and fruits and growing cowshed (Goshala) for milk products to the temple. Here, Govindarajulu provokes Raaja Giridhara Rayalu against Rama, but he recognizes the fact and honesty of Rama. Giridhara Raaya allocates the temple authority to Rama and demotes Govindarajulu as a sweeper. In a short while, Rama makes many changes in the temple by introducing a new form of prayers (Poojas), services (Seva) such as offering Aarti with butter (Navaneetha Aarti), everyday marriage (Nitya Kalyanam) to the god, amenities for devotees, and making sure that the temple flourishes with all rituals as per the Holy Scriptures. Lord Venkateswara is impressed by this and lands on earth to play dice with Rama. 

Henceforth, every day, the Lord visits to spend some time with Rama. In the beginning, the Lord loses a ring in the bet which is given by Goddess Lakshmi as a token of love, but Rama is still under dichotomy whether the event occurred or not. Lakshmi gets angry with Venkateswara and leaves him, only to reside in Rama's house and bless him. Once, when Rama was fanning Lakshmi while she slept, a Tantrik attacks him. Lakshmi gets angry, assumes the form of Chamunda, and kills the Tantrik. Lakshmi, pacified with Venkateswara, returns to him. Later on, Rama craves another glimpse of the Lord; at that exact moment, Venkateswara appears before him and plays the dice, in which the Lord loses all of his jewelry. The next day, when the temple doors are opened, the Lord's main idol is found with no jewelry adorning it, and they are identified at Rama's Ashram. 

At that point, Giridhara Raaya arrives to conduct an interrogation when Rama says that the Lord himself has given it to him. But no one believes it, so the King keeps a test on Rama to prove his innocence by locking him in a prison full of sugarcane and asking him to eat every bit before dawn; otherwise, he will be sentenced to death. Soon, Lord Venkateswara appears in the form of an elephant and finishes it off, and disappears. In the morning, the king is surprised to learn the miracle in which the jewelry returns to Venkateswara. Therefrom, Rama is adored by the name of Hathiram Bhavaji and the pilgrims start visiting him, before seeing the god. Rama gets fed up and decides to leave Tirumala. Noticing this, Venkateswara follows and takes an oath that the former not leave the hill when Rama insists to be buried alive (Sajeeva Samadhi) at the hilltop, as per the vow the Lord has given him. At last, Venkateswara's wives Lakshmi & Bhudevi blame him for the deed. Finally, the movie ends the Lord proclaims that Hathiram Bhavaji is immortal in his day-to-day services at the temple.

Cast

 Nagarjuna as Hathiram Bhavaji
 Anushka Shetty as Krishnamma
 Saurabh Raj Jain as Lord Venkateswara
 Vimala Raman as Lakshmi/ Padmavathi 
 Jagapathi Babu as King
 Pragya Jaiswal as Bhavani
 Rao Ramesh as Govindarajulu
 Sampath Raj as Raaja Giridhara Rayalu
 Brahmanandam as Simhachalam
 Vennela Kishore as Govinda Rajulu's assistant
 Sai Kumar as Anubhavananda Swamy
 Ajay as Garuda 
 Ashmita Karnani as Bhudevi
 Tanikella Bharani as Des Raj Baljot, Hathiram Bhavaji's father
 Sudha as Hathiram Bhavaji's mother
 Raghu Babu as Govinda Rajulu's assistant 
 Sameer as Lord Shiva 
 Pavitra Lokesh as Vakula Devi
 Gundu Sudarshan as Govinda Rajulu's assistant
 Prudhvi Raj
 Prabhakar
 Sudigali Sudheer
 Jenny
 Sana 
 Karuna as Anjana

Soundtrack

The music was composed by M. M. Keeravani and released on Lahari Music Company. The Audio launch held at Hitex N-Convention Centre, in Hyderabad, on 8 January 2017, coinciding with Mukkoti Ekadasi. Akkineni Naga Chaitanya and Akhil Akkineni has launched the audio, Akkineni Nagarjuna, Amala Akkineni, K. Raghavendra Rao, M.M.Keeravani, Jagapathi Babu, Dil Raju, Anushka Shetty, Pragya Jaiswal and several other members of the film industry attended the event.

Critical reception
Sangeetha Devi Dundoo of The Hindu said, "Watch the film for Nagarjuna who comes up with another memorable performance. As you watch the story of a devotee who puts his love for the Lord above everything, it might make you go a little deeper and understand faith beyond rituals". A reviewer from The New Indian Express wrote, "The grandeur on display is unquestionable and the film is certainly a visual treat. But the actors, in their fine splendour, seem to dully run through the motions and the film fails to strike a chord overall."

References

External links
 

2010s Telugu-language films
Indian biographical films
Films directed by K. Raghavendra Rao
Films scored by M. M. Keeravani
Indian drama films
Hindu mythological films
Indian epic films